Utopia Planitia (Greek and Latin: "Nowhere Land Plain") is a large plain within Utopia, the largest recognized impact basin on Mars and in the Solar System with an estimated diameter of . It is the Martian region where the Viking 2 lander touched down and began exploring on September 3, 1976, and the Zhurong rover touched down on May 14, 2021, as a part of the Tianwen-1 mission. It is also in the Casius quadrangle, Amenthes quadrangle, and the Cebrenia quadrangle of Mars.

Many rocks at Utopia Planitia appear perched, as if wind removed much of the soil at their bases. A hard surface crust is formed by solutions of minerals moving up through soil and evaporating at the surface. Some areas of the surface exhibit scalloped topography, a surface that looks like it was carved out by an ice cream scoop. This surface is thought to have formed by the degradation of an ice-rich permafrost. Many features that look like pingos on the Earth are found in Utopia Planitia (~35–50° N; ~80–115° E).

On November 22, 2016, NASA reported finding a large amount of underground ice in the Utopia Planitia region. The volume of water detected has been estimated to be equivalent to the volume of water in Lake Superior.

Scalloped topography

Scalloped topography is common in the mid-latitudes of Mars, between 45° and 60° north and south. It is particularly prominent in the region of Utopia Planitia in the northern hemisphere and in the region of Peneus and Amphitrites Patera in the southern hemisphere. Such topography consists of shallow, rimless depressions with scalloped edges, commonly referred to as scalloped depressions or simply . Scalloped depressions can be isolated or clustered and sometimes seem to coalesce. A typical scalloped depression displays a gentle equator-facing slope and a steeper pole-facing scarp. This topographic asymmetry is probably due to differences in insolation. Scalloped depressions are believed to form from the removal of subsurface material, possibly interstitial ice, by sublimation. This process may still be happening at present.

Pedestal craters

Polygonal patterned ground

Polygonal, patterned ground is quite common in some regions of Mars. It is commonly believed to be caused by the sublimation of ice from the ground. Sublimation is the direct change of solid ice to a gas. This is similar to what happens to dry ice on the Earth. Places on Mars that display polygonal ground may indicate where future colonists can find water ice. Patterned ground forms in a mantle layer, called latitude dependent mantle, that fell from the sky when the climate was different.

Other features in Utopia Planitia

Gallery

In popular culture
In the Star Trek media franchise, Utopia Planitia—both on Mars' surface and a space station in areosynchronous orbit above it—is the site of a major United Federation of Planets shipyard, the Utopia Planitia Fleet Yards. Ships such as the USS Enterprise-D, USS Defiant, USS Voyager and USS Sao Paulo were built there.

Interactive Mars map

See also
 Glaciers on Mars
 Geography of Mars
 List of plains on Mars
 Scalloped topography

Notes

References

External links
 Laser altimetry of the north pole of Mars Utopia Planitia located in upper right
 Google Mars scrollable map – centered on Utopia Planitia
 VL2 Site: Utopia Planitia (NASA)
 PIA00576: Martian Sunrise at Utopia Planitia (NASA Photojournal)
 PIA00530: Frost on Utopia Planitia (NASA Photojournal)
 PIA03796: Utopia Planitia (NASA Photojournal)

Plains on Mars

Albedo features on Mars
Star Trek locations
Amenthes quadrangle
Cebrenia quadrangle